Július Šimon (born 19 July 1965) is a former Slovak football player. He previously played for FC Spartak Trnava, Austria Wien and DAC Dunajská Streda. He also played for Slovakia, for which he participated in 23 matches and scored 6 goals.

External links

References

1965 births
Living people
Czechoslovak footballers
Slovak footballers
Slovakia international footballers
FC VSS Košice players
FC Spartak Trnava players
FK Austria Wien players
SV Ried players
Slovak Super Liga players
People from Lučenec
Sportspeople from the Banská Bystrica Region
Slovak expatriate footballers
Slovak expatriate sportspeople in Austria
Association football midfielders